James Hannigan (born 23 July 1971) is a British composer with credits in the Harry Potter, The Lord of the Rings, Command and Conquer (including Red Alert 3's well-known Soviet March), Dead Space, Warhammer, Cloudy With a Chance of Meatballs, RuneScape, Evil Genius, EA Sports and Theme Park video game series, among others. Hannigan's other music credits include scores for Audible's adaptations of Neil Gaiman's The Sandman (DC Comics), the Audie Award winning Alien dramas (2016–2019), Unseen Academicals (Discworld 37) and BBC Radio 4's adaptations of Neil Gaiman’s Good Omens and Neverwhere. His music is heard in numerous television shows, such as the BBC's Top Gear, Amazon's The Grand Tour, Netflix's 100 Humans, Floor Is Lava, Primeval, Disney's The World According to Jeff Goldblum and BBC America's Primeval. 

In the early years of his career in the 1990s, Hannigan worked as composer for Electronic Arts Europe before basing his studio at Pinewood Studios in England for ten years between 1997 and 2007, where he sometimes worked as a sound designer on films alongside composing.

Hannigan has posted videos on the subject of his early interactive music system design for titles such as Republic: The Revolution (designed by Google DeepMind founder Demis Hassabis) and entries in the Theme Park series of games on YouTube.

Screen Music Connect and Game Music Connect
In 2013, James Hannigan founded popular yearly conference 'Game Music Connect' with friend and fellow composer and industry commentator John Broomhall. Held each year at London’s Southbank Centre, the event ran for three years between 2013 and 2015.

In 2018, it was announced that James Hannigan had founded a new London-based conference on film, television, game and virtual reality music, to be known as 'Screen Music Connect'.

Written publications
In 2004, Hannigan wrote "Changing Our Tune", a cover article for the UK's Develop magazine, outlining some of the differences between scoring for games and conventional linear media forms such as film and television. It was the magazine's first audio related cover feature.

In 2010, Hannigan was interviewed for Tom Hoover’s book, “Soundtrack Nation: Interviews with Today's Top Professionals in Film, Videogame, and Television Scoring”.

In 2015, he wrote a series of articles on video game music for Classic FM.

In 2016, Hannigan wrote a foreword for Tim Summer's book, Understanding Video Game Music, published by Cambridge University Press.

Public performances
In 2007, a collage of Hannigan's music entitled Welcome to Hogwarts was added to Video Games Live debuting in London at the Royal Festival Hall on 22 October 2007, and featuring the Philharmonia orchestra.

 Hannigan's 'Soviet March' theme from Command and Conquer: Red Alert 3 was performed at 'A Night in Fantasia', by the Eminence Symphony Orchestra at the Sydney Entertainment Centre, Australia on 26 September 2009. The popular track can be heard on YouTube. Other public performances include Video Games Music Live and the Games & Symphonies concert series.

On 28 October 2010, a concert of Hannigan's music was held at St. Mary's Church, Nottingham, England. As part of the GameCity 2010 Festival, the concert featured The Pinewood Singers and soloists performing the theme of 'Harry Potter and the Deathly Hallows – Part 1', pieces from Command and Conquer: Red Alert 3, Evil Genius and other titles

On 29 June 2012, Hannigan was interviewed in front of a live audience at the Royal Albert Hall's Elgar Room by presenter Tommy Pearson, as part of the BAFTA Sponsored event 'Conversations With Composers'. The event featured an overview of the composer's work and live performances from soprano, Tamara Zivadinovic.

In May 2018, it was announced that there would be a performance of Hannigan's RuneScape music by the Royal Philharmonic Concert Orchestra at RuneFest 2018.

Live recording
Hannigan has worked with the Philharmonia Orchestra, The Skywalker Symphony Orchestra, The Slovak Symphony Orchestra and The Chamber Orchestra of London, recording at Abbey Road Studios, AIR Studios and Skywalker Ranch. The composer is known to be an analogue synthesizer enthusiast.

Awards

Hannigan's music scores have been nominated five times by the British Academy of Film and Television Arts (BAFTA) and Hannigan won a BAFTA Award with Electronic Arts in 2000 for Sim Theme Park (UK title: Theme Park World). In 2010 his score for the Harry Potter and the Half-Blood Prince video game received a BAFTA nomination and won an International Film Music Critics Association (IFMCA) award. In 2014, Hannigan was nominated for a Develop Award for his work on RuneScape. His other BAFTA-nominated scores include those of Republic: The Revolution, FA Premier League Manager and Evil Genius.

Credited works as composer

Steelrising (Spiders Studio/NACON)
Discworld (by Terry Pratchett; Penguin Random House)
The Sandman (Acts ii and iii, By Neil Gaiman; DC Comics/Audible/Amazon; Webby People's Voice Award, Best Score and Sound Design)
The Sandman (Act i, By Neil Gaiman; DC Comics/Audible/Amazon)
Evil Genius 2 (Rebellion Developments)
Call of Antia (FunPlus)
Alien III (By William Gibson; Audible)
RuneScape: The Orchestral Collection 
Super Smash Bros. Ultimate (Additional Music; Nintendo)
 Unseen Academicals (Audible/Amazon)
 Alien: Sea of Sorrows
 Alien: River of Pain (Audible/Amazon)
 Alien: Out of the Shadows (Audible/Amazon)
 Dead Space 3 (Electronic Arts)
 Terraria: Otherworld (as guest composer)
 Harry Potter and the Order of the Phoenix (EA/Warner Bros. 'Best of 2007', IGN; 'Best VG Score', Movie Music UK Awards 2007).
 Super Smash Bros. Wii U (Nintendo)
 Transformers Universe
 Neverwhere (BBC)
 RuneScape (Jagex Studio)
 Good Omens (BBC)
 Harry Potter and the Deathly Hallows: Part 2 (EA Bright Light Studio)
 Harry Potter and the Deathly Hallows: Part 1 (EA Bright Light Studio)
 Command and Conquer: Red Alert 3 (Electronic Arts)
 Command and Conquer 4: Tiberian Twilight (EA LA)
Harry Potter audio books (Nar: Stephen Fry; Pottermore)
 Primeval (Impossible Pictures/ITV)
 Art Academy (Nintendo/Headstrong)
 The Lord of the Rings: Aragorn's Quest (Headstrong/Warner Bros.)
 FreeLancer (Digital Anvil/Microsoft)
 Harry Potter audiobook series (Read by Stephen Fry; Audible)
 Harry Potter and the Half-Blood Prince (Electronic Arts/Warner Bros; BAFTA nomination, 2010)
 Cloudy with a Chance of Meatballs (Ubisoft/Sony Pictures)
 Saints Row IV (additional music)
 Evil Genius (VU Games. BAFTA Nomination, Music, 2005)
 Command and Conquer: Red Alert 3 Uprising (EA LA)
 Command and Conquer: Red Alert 3 Commander's Challenge (EA LA)
 Republic The Revolution (Eidos. BAFTA Nomination, Music, 2004)
 Conquest: Frontier Wars (Digital Anvil/Ubisoft)
 Warhammer: SotHR (Mindscape; Games Workshop)
 NASCAR Thunder 2004 (2003), Electronic Arts, Inc.
 NASCAR Racing 2002 Season (2002), Sierra Entertainment, Inc.
 NASCAR Thunder 2003 (2002), Electronic Arts, Inc.
 F1 2000 (EA Sports)
 F1 Manager (EA Sports)
 FIFA 96, FIFA 98 (EA Sports)
 Theme Park World (Sim Theme Park in US) (EA/Bullfrog; BAFTA Award, 2000)
 Hasbro Family Game Night 3 (EA Bright Light)
 Grand Prix 4 (Infogrames)
 Brute Force (Digital Anvil/Microsoft. Co-composed with Jesper Kyd and Mike Reagan)
 Catwoman (EA/Warner Bros.)
 Reign of Fire (KUJU/BAM)
 Mr. Bean (VG)
 Lost In Space (Sound Design; New Line Cinema)
 Theme Park Inc. (Simcoaster in US) (EA/Bullfrog)
 Warhammer: Dark Omen (Electronic Arts; Sound Design)
 Action Man (Hasbro/Intelligent Games; multiple titles in the series)
 Privateer: The Darkening (Electronic Arts, Origin Systems)
 FA Premier League Manager(EA Sports; BAFTA Nomination, 2000) FIFA Soccer Manager (EA Sports)
 Cutthroat Island (Software Creations)
 Short Cuts series (Chappell)
 Big Screen (West One Music)
 Distorted Reality (Chappell)
 Jetix (multiple titles in the series)
 Flight of the Amazon Queen (Renegade)
 Yamaha SuperCross ATV Racing Infestation (Frontier Developments)
 MoHo (Lost Toys)
 Ball Breakers Beasts and Bumpkins (Electronic Arts)
 Gummy Bears Crazy Golf (Beyond Reality Games)
 Darklight Conflict (Electronic Arts; additional music)
 Space Hulk'' (Electronic Arts/Games Workshop; music for the PlayStation version)

References

External links

 
 Game Music Connect
 Screen Music Connect
 James Hannigan on IMDB

1971 births
20th-century British composers
20th-century British male musicians
20th-century classical composers
21st-century British composers
21st-century British male musicians
21st-century classical composers
British classical composers
British male classical composers
British record producers
Living people
Place of birth missing (living people)
Video game composers